The Melting Pot is a chain of franchised fondue restaurants in the United States and Canada. The Tampa, Florida based company has 97 locations . The Melting Pot menu contains various cheese fondues, wines, salads, entrees of meat and seafood served with dipping sauces and oil or broth to be cooked in, and chocolate fondues. It is part of Front Burner Brands.

History
The first Melting Pot opened in April 1975 in Maitland, Florida – a suburban city of the Orlando Metropolitan Area – and served only three items on its menu. With permission from the original owners, Mark, Mike and Bob Johnston opened The Melting Pot of Tallahassee in 1979. As the restaurant expanded its franchise, the menu grew larger. In 1985, the Johnston brothers purchased all rights to the Melting Pot brand.

Design
The restaurants' interiors are designed using dark red and black colors. They are dimly lit; all seating is mostly in booths, with private booths away from the main room.

Headquarters
Its headquarters are located in Tampa, Florida.

Management

The current CEO of Front Burner, The Melting Pot's management company, is Bob Johnston, the youngest brother of founders Mike and Mark, who once worked as a dishwasher as early as fourteen at his brothers' first location in Tallahassee, and by years he got more involved in the growing business until he became the franchise's president and then promoted to be Front Burner's CEO in 2012.

Menu
A complete meal features a cheese fondue, a salad, main course and a chocolate fondue for dessert. The four courses are offered individually or as a "4 Course Experience." The 4 Course Experience includes one of several preset entrees, one serving of cheese, one salad, and one serving of chocolate.  Main courses are still fondues, but include more typical entrees of meat, poultry, pasta and seafood. The franchise also produces "special-occasion" packages for anniversaries, weddings and other events.

References

External links

1975 establishments in Florida
Companies based in Tampa, Florida
Restaurant chains in the United States
Restaurant franchises
Restaurants established in 1975
Restaurants in Florida
Companies that filed for Chapter 11 bankruptcy in 2011